The last was a Dutch unit of mass, volume, and number, and a large English unit of weight, mass, volume, and number. It referred to standardized amounts of ships' lading and varied by commodity and over time.

Name
The term derives from Old English , ultimately from a Proto-Germanic root reconstructed as *hlaþ- or *hlað- ("to place"). It is also parallel and probably influenced by the Middle Dutch and Middle Low German , used in identical senses as a load, cargo, or standardized unit.

Weight
The last subsequently varied with the different values given to the sack of wool.

The flax and feather lasts were 1,700 avoirdupois pounds (about ).

The last was also used as a measure of rice in Dutch Formosa.

Quantity
(Elsewhere, the herring last was treated by volume.)

The  comprised 20 dicker of 10 skins each (200 total) or, sometimes, 12 dozen skins (144 total).

Volume
The English last could also be understood as the volume occupied by the other lasts. The beer last was 12 barrels, the cod last and some herring lasts were also 12 barrels, and the pitch last was 12 or 14 barrels.

The Polish last used for bulk trade in dry goods from the 16th to 19th century comprised 30 Polish bushels. In the early 19th century, this amounted to  but varied over time and location.

The Dutch last, or Scheepslast, has been equated to essentially  of shipping space.

See also
 lading, ballast
 load

References

Obsolete units of measurement